Kaothip Tidadin, real name Tidadin Hin-on (born 16 August 1989), is a Thai luk thung singer, formed and managed by GMM Grammy. She started on stage in 2008 as a singer in a Nongmai Taidaw Season 1 project. She has released 2 studio albums and 10 singles.

Early life
Kaothip was born in Amnat Charoen province to Vinai and Lamphao Hin-aon. She finished primary education from Ban Som Sa-aad Nuengkrung School, secondary education from Nawieng Chullawitthaya School and tertiary education from Dhurakij Pundit University.

Musical career
Kaothip began singing as a child, because her father, Mor lam, is also a musician. She was the most talented in her primary school, and got support from her teachers and her parents.

In Secondary 6, Mr. Boonchuei Sangchan, the school director, heard that Sala Khunnawut wanted a new Luk thung singer in a record label Grammy Gold (network by GMM Grammy). Boonchuei called her to record demo-cassette for audition, and she debuted.

After that, Sala Khunnawut wrote first songs for her; The Shy High School's girls (Sao Mor Play Yang Ai Hak) and Last Term, giving her the stage name Kaothip Tidadin.

Acting career
Kaothip began acting in 2015. In 2017, she played her first television role in the series Nay Hoi Thamin (Remake version). She was cast as Bua Kiew, with Phai Phongsathon cast as Si Ho. In 2020, she co-started in the series Mongkut Dok Ya, cast as Ging-aor Siengsawan.

MC
 Online 
 2021 :  On Air YouTube:Kaothip Lovers

References

1989 births
Living people
Kaothip Tidadin
Kaothip Tidadin
Kaothip Tidadin
Kaothip Tidadin
Kaothip Tidadin
Kaothip Tidadin
Kaothip Tidadin
Kaothip Tidadin
Kaothip Tidadin